Graafstroom is a former municipality in the western Netherlands, in the province of South Holland, and the region of Alblasserwaard. The former municipality had a population of 9,697 in 2004, and covered an area of 69.32 km² (26.76 mile²) of which 2.21 km² (0.85 mile²) was water. Since 2013 Graafstroom had been a part of the new municipality of Molenwaard (ceased to exist in 2019).

The former municipality of Graafstroom consisted of the following population centres: Bleskensgraaf en Hofwegen, Brandwijk, Goudriaan, Molenaarsgraaf, Ottoland, Oud-Alblas, and Wijngaarden.

External links
Official website
Basic data
Statistics in Dutch  (pdf) - with (towards the end) a map showing the neighborhoods and (a few pages further) the population figures etc. as well as the grouping into quarters
Arriva Region West:  - select bus line 151

1986 establishments in the Netherlands
States and territories established in 1986
Municipalities of the Netherlands disestablished in 2013
Former municipalities of South Holland
Molenlanden